Necalphus is a genus of beetles in the family Cerambycidae, containing the following species:

 Necalphus asellus (Pascoe, 1866)
 Necalphus decoratus (Monné & Magno, 1992)

References

Acanthoderini